The 2016 Queen's Birthday Honours  for Australia were announced on 13 June 2016 by the Governor-General, Sir Peter Cosgrove.
The Birthday Honours were appointments by some of the 16 Commonwealth realms of Queen Elizabeth II to various orders and honours to reward and highlight good works by citizens of those countries. The Birthday Honours are awarded as part of the Queen's Official Birthday celebrations during the month of June.

Order of Australia

Companion (AC)

General Division

Officer (AO)

General Division

Military Division

Member (AM)

General Division

Military Division

Medal (OAM)

General Division

Military Division

Meritorious Service

Public Service Medal (PSM)

Australian Police Medal (APM)

Australian Fire Service Medal (AFSM)

Ambulance Service Medal (ASM)

Emergency Services Medal (ESM)

Distinguished and Conspicuous Service

Distinguished Service Cross (DSC)

Distinguished Service Medal (DSM)

Commendation for Distinguished Service

Bar to the Conspicuous Service Cross (CSC & Bar)

Conspicuous Service Cross

Conspicuous Service Medal (CSM)

Meritorious Unit Citation

References

External links
Australian Honours Lists, www.gg.gov.au
The Queen's Birthday 2016 Honours List, www.gg.gov.au
Official list:
S1 - Order of Australia, www.gg.gov.au
S2 - Distinguished and Conspicuous Service, www.gg.gov.au
S3 - Meritorious Service, www.gg.gov.au

2016 awards in Australia
Orders, decorations, and medals of Australia